Burtin is a French surname that may refer to
Armand Burtin (1896–1972), French middle-distance runner
Jacques Burtin (born 1955), French composer, writer and filmmaker
Nicolas Burtin (born 1972), French alpine skier
Raphaël Burtin (born 1977), French alpine skier, brother of Nicolas
Will Burtin (1908–1972), German graphic designer